Pokrovskoye is a rural locality (a village) in Kisnemskoye Rural Settlement, Vashkinsky District, Vologda Oblast, Russia. The population was 211 as of 2002. There are 5 streets.

Geography 
Pokrovskoye is located on the Kema River, 71 km northwest of Lipin Bor (the district's administrative centre) by road. Dryabloye is the nearest rural locality.

References 

Rural localities in Vashkinsky District